Rolands Upatnieks (13 December 1932 – 11 May 1994) was a Latvian luger. He competed in the men's doubles event at the 1976 Winter Olympics.

References

External links

1932 births
1994 deaths
Latvian male lugers
Olympic lugers of the Soviet Union
Lugers at the 1976 Winter Olympics
Place of birth missing